The Haverford Fords football team represented Haverford College in college football. The team started in 1879, just the third school in Pennsylvania to field a football team. The team was rivals with Swarthmore. The 1894 game claims to have the first "action shot" photograph of a game. College athletic director James Babbitt was an important figure in the 1905 rules negotiations that brought the forward pass, 10-yard first down and other innovations into the game.

Haverford no longer has a team. The school  ended the football program in 1972.

References

Haverford Fords football